Tunitas, California was a small unincorporated community in San Mateo County. It was originally located on State Route 1 until that state route was moved to the west. It was also renamed Lobitos.

Arroyo de las Tunitas is shown on the diseños, about 1839, of the San Gregorio and Canada Verde grants. The name means “A small bush…grows super-abundant at and near its mouth, and its fruit is known to the present generation as sea apples.”

References

Former settlements in San Mateo County, California